Zhou Bo (died 169 BC), posthumously known as Marquis Wu of Jiang (绛武侯), was a Chinese military general and politician who served as a chancellor of the early Western Han dynasty.

Life
Zhou Bo's ancestral home was in Juan County (present-day Yuanyang County, Henan) but he was born in Pei County in present-day Jiangsu. He was a friend of Liu Bang (Emperor Gaozu), the founding emperor of the Han dynasty. Around 206 BC, he joined Liu Bang in rebelling against the Qin dynasty. After the fall of the Qin dynasty, Zhou Bo fought on Liu Bang's side in the Chu–Han Contention against Liu Bang's rival, Xiang Yu.

After Liu Bang became emperor and established the Han dynasty, he enfeoffed Zhou Bo as the Marquis of Jiang to honour him for his contributions in battle. During the regency of Empress Lü, Zhou Bo served as Grand Commandant (太尉). Zhou Bo later served as the Right Chancellor during the reign of Liu Bang's son, Liu Heng (Emperor Wen), but resigned within a year as he realised that his aptitude for the position was inferior to that of Chen Ping's. However, Chen Ping died soon after holding both Chancellor positions; on 5 December 179 BCE, Zhou Bo was re-appointed Chancellor. Zhou Bo was relieved of his Chancellor post and sent back to his fiefdom in the week of 22 January 177 BCE; Guan Ying was appointed Chancellor in his place on 29 January. 

After Zhou Bo died, Emperor Wen awarded him the posthumous title "Marquis Wu" (literally "military marquis").

One of Zhou Bo's sons, Zhou Yafu, served under Liu Qi (Emperor Jing), Emperor Wen's successor, and played a key role in suppressing the Rebellion of the Seven States.

References

 Sima, Qian. Records of the Grand Historian (Shi Ji) vol. 57.
 Ban, Gu. Book of Han (Han Shu) vol. 40.

169 BC deaths
Han dynasty generals from Jiangsu
Han dynasty politicians from Jiangsu
Han dynasty prime ministers
Politicians from Xuzhou